Pingguoyuan station is a station on Line 1, Line 6 and Line S1 of the Beijing Subway, located in Pingguoyuan Subdistrict, Shijingshan District, Beijing.

The station for Line 1 was opened on April 23, 1973. Pingguoyuan station on Line 1 is closed for renovation from April 18, 2020 to late 2023. The station for Line 6 and Line S1 was opened on December 31, 2021.

The Line 1 station and Line 6 station are underground, and the Line S1 station is elevated.

Station layout 

The line 1 of Pingguoyuan station has two underground side platforms and both are the only two platforms of Beijing Subway stations that haven't installed platform gates due to the aging of platform devices.

The station for Line 1 is closed for renovation, and the platform gates will be installed after the renovation is finished.

Line 6 has an underground island platform and Line S1 has 2 elevated side platforms.

Exits 
There are 4 exits, lettered A, B, C, and D. All exits have a stairlift. These exits are temporarily closed due to the renovation of Line 1. There are 6 other exits, lettered E, F, G, H, I and J. Currently only exits F, H, I and J are operational. Exits F and G are accessible via elevators, whilst exit H has a stairlift.

Gallery

Line 1

Line 6 & Line S1

References

External links 
 

Beijing Subway stations in Shijingshan District
Railway stations in China opened in 1973